Coiled-coil domain containing 74A is a protein that in humans is encoded by the CCDC74A gene. The protein is most highly expressed in the testis and may play a role in developmental pathways. The gene has undergone duplication in the primate lineage within the last 9 million years, and its only true ortholog is found in Pan troglodytes.

Gene
The gene locus is located on the long arm of chromosome 2 at 2q21.1, and spans 5991 base pairs.
A common alternative alias is LOC90557.

Transcript
The mRNA encoding the largest peptide product, isoform 6, contains 8 exons and 9 introns. It is 1842bps in length. Altogether, 11 protein isoforms have been characterized as a result of alternative splicing.

Protein
The longest CCDC74A peptide product, isoform 6, is 420 amino acids in length. This protein has a predicted molecular weight of 45.9kD and a predicted isoelectric point of 10.65. The entire length of the protein is evenly enriched in lysine and arginine residues. The protein contains 2 eukaryotic coiled-coil domains of unknown function, CCDC92 and CCDC74C. Its predicted localization is to the nucleus, but the protein may shuttle between the nucleus and the cytoplasm due to the presence of both a nuclear localization signal and a nuclear export signal.

Secondary structure

Predicted secondary structure for CCDC74A consists of 4 alpha helix regions, which are summarized in the table below and the diagram to the right.

Post-translational modification
A threonine residue (T395) which is highly conserved across Animalia orthologs may serve as a phosphorylation site by PKG kinase. Additionally, SUMOylation, methylation, and acetylation sites are predicted within highly conserved regions and may play a part in regulation. These predicted post-translational modifications and conserved domains are summarized in the diagram to the right.

Homology
In humans, CCDC74A has one important paralog, CCDC74B. Gene duplication is estimated to have occurred approximately 7 million years ago (MYA). As such, the only true ortholog of CCDC74A is found in Pan troglodytes, and is not found in Gorilla gorilla. However, distant orthologs prior to gene duplication are conserved in species that diverged from humans between 92-797 MYA. This includes species as distant as Cnidaria, but excludes Porifera or species outside of the kingdom Animalia.

Function 
CCDC74A localization, expression, and interactions suggest that the protein may play a role in the expression of genes related to developmental and differentiation pathways, particularly during spermatogenesis.

Expression
The protein has been found most highly expressed in the testes and trachea. It is also expressed at moderate levels in the lung, brain, prostate, spinal cord, bone marrow, ovary, thymus, and thyroid gland.

Interactions 
Consistent with predicted post-translational methylation, CCDC74A has been shown to interact with the lysine demethylase KDM1A through a yeast 2-hybrid assay. Additionally, through a yeast 2-hybrid assay, CCDC74A has been shown to interact with the lymphocyte activation molecule associated protein SH2D1A.

Clinical significance
In a study on androgen-independent prostate cancer, knockout of CCDC74A in androgen-dependent prostate cancer inhibited cell proliferation. Experiments in genital fibroblast cells have shown that CCDC74A expression significantly increases upon exposure to dihydrotestosterone.

References

Further reading